Adonis Shropshire, or Adonis for short, is an American songwriter and record producer.

He has written and or produced singles including: Mariah Carey's "I Stay In Love", Usher Raymond's "My Boo", P. Diddy's "I Need a Girl (Part One)", "I Need a Girl (Part Two)",  Chris Brown's "Say Goodbye", Ciara's "And I", Marques Houston's "Circle", Day26's "Since You've Been Gone", Enrique Iglesias's "Push", Ginuwine's "Last Chance", Beyoncé's "Summertime", and has helped compose "Lee Taemin's Play Me. Adonis has been professionally writing since 2001, receiving his first formal credit on 2001's "Walking On Sunshine" by Pop Music Icon Jennifer Lopez. His songs have helped contribute to the sale of almost 200 Million Albums Worldwide.

History 
Adonis was born in Atlanta, Georgia, and grew up in Chattanooga, Tennessee, where he attended the Chattanooga Phoenix III High School for the Performing Arts. While in middle school, he met Usher Raymond IV (the two would later form a group before Raymond's move to Atlanta). While frequenting a local studio he learned the art of creating songs, music production, using audio equipment, recording, as well as structuring and writing lyric melody. Currently Adonis is the CEO, and Founder of Beatstreet, Inc.

While having a friendship with R&B trio Blaque, he would travel to various recording sessions with them. Natina Reed and her former Blaque group member Shamari Fears, noticed a particular talent he had for producing vocals and allowed him to contribute in the studio. These sessions were his first "real" recording sessions, which consisted of helping vocal produce three songs for the group's debut album.

In 1997, he moved back to Atlanta to pursue his dream of breaking into the music industry. While in a local singing group he was introduced to Rowdy Records exec Kirk Woods (The Woodland Entertainment Group) who would later become his manager. When the group disbanded in 2000, he started writing songs for other recording artists. This prompted his manager to set up a meeting with famed producer and CEO of Bad Boy Worldwide Sean "Diddy" Combs. While in New York Adonis worked on the album of pop icon Jennifer Lopez's "J.LO". This was Adonis' first songwriting credit. Soon after Diddy signed Adonis to his publishing venture with EMI as part of his "Hit Men Squad." Immediately Adonis began to craft songs for Faith Evans, Carl Thomas, 112, Cheri Dennis, Beyoncé, Usher, B2K, and Ciara

His affiliation with Bad Boy led to him working with Noontime (which had a co-management deal with Bad Boy). That work resulted in him meeting Bryan-Michael Cox. Adonis's relationship with Cox soon had him producing and writing for Chris Brown, Nicole Scherzinger, Mariah Carey and Gwen Stefani. Although prior to working with Cox, Adonis had written and produced an extensive body of work (including Hot 100 #1 hits such as Usher's "My Boo") in addition to P. Diddy's "I Need a Girl (Part One)" and "I Need a Girl (Part Two)" and two Grammy Awards (for work on albums by Carey and Usher), Chris Brown's "Say Goodbye" marked his first Hot R&B Chart #1 hit with Cox.

In 2014 Adonis began working with Kristinia DeBarge on her third studio album.
On January 5, 2015, he and DeBarge started releasing new music exclusively through YouTube. She entitled the project "New Music Mondays".

Selected production and writing credits

Grammy Awards and nominations 
The Grammy Awards are awarded annually by the National Academy of Recording Arts and Sciences of the United States. Adonis has received 3 awards from 17 nominations.

|-
|  || Faithfully || Best Contemporary R&B Album || 
|-
|  || Confessions || Best Contemporary R&B Album || 
|-
|  || My Boo|| Best R&B Song || 
|-
|  || Confessions || Album Of The Year || 
|-
|  || Hurt No More || Best Contemporary R&B Album || 
|-
|  || My Boo || Best R&B Performance by a Duo or Group with Vocal || 
|-
|  || The Emancipation of Mimi || Best Contemporary R&B Album || 
|-
|  || The Emancipation of Mimi || Album Of The Year || 
|-
|  || Chris Brown|| Best Contemporary R&B Album || 
|-
|  || Just like You || Best Contemporary R&B Album || 
|-
|  || Back of My Lac' || Best Contemporary R&B Album || 
|-
|  ||  The Introduction of Marcus Cooper || Best Contemporary R&B Album || 
|-
|  ||  Still Standing || Best R&B Album || 
|-
|  ||  My World 2.0 || Best Pop Vocal Album || 
|-
|  ||  Fortune || Best Urban Contemporary Album || 
|-
|  ||  TGT || Best R&B Album || 
|-
|  ||  Side Effects of You || Best Urban Contemporary Album ||

References

External links 
 Adonis Shropshire on Myspace

1977 births
Living people
Songwriters from Tennessee
Grammy Award winners